Daniela Castro (born Danielle Stefani Castro Arellano on 17 August 1969) is a Mexican actress and singer.

Biography
She felt an attraction for music at a very young age, and this is why the entered the Centro de Estudios Artísticos de Televisa (CEA), which took her in another direction. She ended up performing in plays at some theaters in Mexico, which she continued doing occasionally. She was offered a role in a telenovela because of her success in the theatre.  She has starred in 13 telenovelas to date. After a long absence from television, she returned to play Lizabeta in Pasión in 2007. She also played the main role (as Rosa) in one of the episodes of Mujeres Asesinas 2.

Also, she acted in Mi pecado where she played Rosario, her greatest antagonist to date. She considers Cadenas de amargura the telenovela that brought her the success and recognition that made her the actress she is today. Diana Bracho (who is considered one of the best actresses in Mexico) was part of the cast. Raul Araiza who played her boyfriend in the story was also her boyfriend in real life. Cynthia Klitbo, Delia Casanova, Fernando Luján, Alexis Ayala, and Raymundo Capetillo also participated in this story. 

Daniela plays Cecila Vizcaino, a young girl whose parents die in a tragic accident. Cecila is sent to her aunt's house after her parents' death.  Evangelina who is a very possessive, moral, and religious person who wants to control her life, prevents her from committing sin and living her life on her own terms. On the other hand, her aunt Natalia (Delia Casanova) is good to her and is the one that protects her. Daniela plays a very timid, quiet girl, who tries to fight for her right to live her life her way, trusts her aunts without knowing all the pain one of them is causing her.

Cañaveral de Pasiones is a novel written by Caridad Bravo Adams. The story was produced by Humberto Zurita and Christian Bach who have only delivered well- made stories. Daniela plays Julia Santos, a very sensual role compared to Cadenas de Amargura. Juan Soler is the lead actor and plays Pablo Montero.

The story is about two families: the Santos and the Monteros. Because of some misunderstandings, Pablo's mother Joséfina, played by Angelica Aragón, believes Julia's mother Margarita (Felicia Mercado), who happened to be one of the most beautiful woman in town, is the lover of her husband Amador (César Évora). However, she is mistaken, the one that is her husband's lover is Dinorah (Azela Robinson), Margarita's sister and Julia's aunt. In order to prevent her sister from running away with Amador, Margarita goes to meet him, and they end up having an accident during a rain storm, and subsequently dying, reason enough for Josefina to think she is right; and she tries to make Julia's life miserable. She prevents Pablo from seeing her and sends him to the Capital to study. As an adult and engaged to be married, Pablo returns home. Although engaged, he sees Julia again and falls in love with her all over again. They will have to fight for their love against Josefina, Dinorah, and Julia's Father Fausto (Leonardo Daniel).

After a long absence she returned in the telenovela Pasión, which is situated around 1780 in the New Spain. She plays blind Lizabeta de Salamanca; the difference here is that she plays the antagonist. At first, she was afraid to play this role, but she subsequently earned positive reviews.  She also starred in a horror movie called Viaje directo al infierno in 1989.

In addition, she recorded an album called Junto a ti. She has mentioned that her biggest dream was to perform a song with her father (Jorge) for her mother. She planned to record a second album with her uncles and her dad; but her uncle suddenly died.  Because of the respect and love she had for her father, the project has been delayed.

Discography

 Desencuentro (1998)
 Junto A Ti  (1999)

Filmography

Films

Television

Awards and nominations

Premios TVyNovelas

Premios Bravo

Premios ACE (Argentina)

Premios People en Español

References

External links

1969 births
Living people
Mexican telenovela actresses
Mexican television actresses
Mexican film actresses
Mexican stage actresses
Mexican women singers
Actresses from Mexico City
Singers from Mexico City
20th-century Mexican actresses
21st-century Mexican actresses
People from Mexico City